was a town located in Higashikanbara District, Niigata Prefecture, Japan.

As of 2003, the town had an estimated population of 5,000 and a density of 59.39 persons per km². The total area was 84.19 km².

On April 1, 2005, Tsugawa, along with the town of Kanose, and the villages of Kamikawa and Mikawa (all from Higashikanbara District) were merged to create the town of Aga.

Climate 

Dissolved municipalities of Niigata Prefecture
Aga, Niigata